Toporinka is a rural locality (a village) in Yazykovsky Selsoviet, Blagovarsky District, Bashkortostan, Russia. The population was 322 as of 2010. There are 3 streets.

Geography 
Toporinka is located 13 km northwest of Yazykovo (the district's administrative centre) by road. Mirny is the nearest rural locality.

References 

Rural localities in Blagovarsky District